Horton is a township in eastern Ontario, Canada, at the confluence of the Bonnechere River and the Ottawa River in Renfrew County. The Town of Renfrew was originally part of Horton Township.

Communities
The township comprises the communities of Castleford, Castleford Station, Cotieville, Fergusons Beach, Goshen, Lochwinnoch (partially), Mayhew and Thompson Hill.

The town of Castleford is the first of five chutes along the Bonnechere River. The others being Renfrew, Douglas, Fourth Chute and Eganville. The chutes used were for moving timber past rapids and waterfalls.

Demographics 

Former attraction
Storyland, closed 2011

See also
List of townships in Ontario

References

External links

Lower-tier municipalities in Ontario
Municipalities in Renfrew County
Township municipalities in Ontario